Azhar (from  ) may refer to:

Azhar (name), an Arabic-origin name (including a list of persons with the name)
Azhari (name), an Arabic-origin name (including a list of persons with the name)
 Azhar (film), a 2016 Indian biographical film

See also
 Al-Azhar (disambiguation)
 Azharite